LQ may refer to:

Businesses and organizations
 Lahore Qalandars, a cricket team franchise in the Pakistan Super League
 La Quinta Inns & Suites, a North American hotel chain (operated by LQ Corporation)
 Laser Quest, an indoor lasertag game company
 Latin Quarter (nightclub), New York City, US
 Lebanese Air Transport (IATA airline code: LQ)
 Lanmei Airlines (IATA airline code: LQ)
 No. 629 Squadron RAF (squadron code: LQ)
 London and Quadrant (L&Q), a housing association in England, UK

Places
 La Quinta, California, American resort city
 Latin Quarter (nightclub), New York City, US
 Lunar quadrangles, see List of quadrangles on the Moon
 Palmyra Atoll (FIPS PUB 10-4 territory code)

Other uses
 Last quarter, a phase of the Moon
 Letter-quality printer, a form of computer printer
 Lexus LQ, luxury XUV car
 Linear–quadratic regulator, a type of controller
 LinuxQuestions.org, a self-help website
 Location quotient, a concept in economic base analysis:

See also

 Latin Quarter (disambiguation)